The Tower of Silence (German: Der Turm des Schweigens) is a 1925 German mystic melodrama directed by Johannes Guter and starring Xenia Desni and Nigel Barrie. The Tower of Silence is a silent film, and one of the few films by Guter to survive. In 2007, it became the director's first film to be restored for modern audiences.

Plot
The Tower of Silence centres around Eva (Xenia Desni), a beautiful woman kept in a high tower by her grieving widowed father. When an attractive explorer, Arved (Nigel Barrie), is saved by Eva after crashing his car near the tower, he introduces her into high society. When Arved, who was previously believed to be dead, discovers that he has lost his fiancée to ex-partner and aviator Wilfred, he must decide whether to reveal a secret that will destroy his old friend.

Cast
 Xenia Desni as Eva
 Nigel Barrie as Arved Holl
 Fritz Delius as Wilfred Durian
 Avrom Morewski (Abraham Morewski) as Eldor Vartalun
 Gustav Oberg as Ceel
 Hanna Ralph as Liane
 Hermann Leffler as Mac Farland
 Philipp Manning as Werner Neuwitt
 Jenny Jugo as Evi

References

External links
 
 

1925 films
1925 drama films
German drama films
Films directed by Johannes Guter
German silent feature films
Films of the Weimar Republic
Films produced by Erich Pommer
UFA GmbH films
German black-and-white films
Melodrama films
Silent drama films
1920s German films